George Mattson may refer to:

George Mattson (martial artist), American karate practitioner
George Mattson (rower) (1908-1997), American Olympic rower
George Mattson (synthesizer inventor) (born 1954), American inventor

See also
George Matson (1817–1898), Australian cricketer